Lampert is a surname of Western European origin, possibly from an Old Frankish name for the Lombards. It is also a given name. Bearers of the name include:

People

Given name
Ordered chronologically
 Lambert of Hersfeld (c. 1024–1082/85), German historian
 Lampert of Hungary (c. 1040–c. 1095), Hungarian prince
 Lampert Hont-Pázmány (lord) (1060s–1132), Hungarian lord
 Lampert Hont-Pázmány (bishop) (died 1275), Hungarian prelate
 Lampert Hermán (died 1324), Hungarian nobleman
 Lampert Distelmeyer (1522–1588), German jurist and Chancellor of Mark Brandenburg

Surname
Ordered alphabetically
 Alois Lampert (born 1932), Liechtensteiner cyclist
 Andrzej Lampert (born 1981), Polish singer
 Benedikt Lampert (born 1985), Liechtensteiner cyclist
 Carl Lampert (1894–1944), Austrian Roman Catholic priest, saint and critic of Nazism during World War II
 Eddie Lampert (born 1962), American businessman
 Emma Lampert Cooper (1855–1920), American painter
 Florian Lampert (1863–1930), American politician
 Gerald Lampert, Canadian arts administrator and the namesake of the Gerald Lampert Award
 Harry Lampert (1916–2004), American cartoonist and contract bridge author
 Irwin Lampert, Canadian judge
 Jacob Lampert (1856–1921), English-American cigar manufacturer
 James Benjamin Lampert (1914–1978), American general
 Khen Lampert, Israeli author and philosopher
 Laurence Lampert, (born c. 1943), Canadian philosopher and Nietzsche scholar
 Michael Stephen Lampert, American schoolteacher
 Vince Lampert (born 1963), American Roman Catholic priest and exorcist
 Zohra Lampert, American actress

Fictional characters
 Regina "Reggie" Lampert, female protagonist of the 1963 film Charade, played by Audrey Hepburn

See also
Lamberg
Lambert (name)
Lambertus
Lamprecht (name)

Surnames from given names